Muirgus mac Domnaill (died 985) was 35th King of Uí Maine.

Muirgus's time is not noted in the Irish annals, the only direct reference is to his death in 985, which states he was slain. No further details are given.

References

 Annals of Ulster at CELT: Corpus of Electronic Texts at University College Cork
 Annals of Tigernach at CELT: Corpus of Electronic Texts at University College Cork
Revised edition of McCarthy's synchronisms at Trinity College Dublin.
 Byrne, Francis John (2001), Irish Kings and High-Kings, Dublin: Four Courts Press, 

People from County Galway
People from County Roscommon
10th-century Irish monarchs
Kings of Uí Maine
985 deaths
Year of birth unknown